Bicton House, or Bickton House, is a late 18th- or early 19th-century country house, which stands on the campus of Bicton College, Bicton, near Exmouth, East Devon. It is a Grade II* listed building. The park and gardens are Grade I listed in the National Register of Historic Parks and Gardens.

It is located about three miles from Sidmouth, in Devonshire. It had been in the East Budleigh Hundred.

Manor

12th and 13th centuries 
This manor was held in demesne by William Portitor, the king's door-keeper, at the time of the taking the Domesday Survey. It was held as the king's gaol for the county of Devon.
The manor of Bicton was granted by King Henry I to John Janitor. In 1229, Ralph Balistarius, or Le Balister (the cross-bow-bearer), occupied the manor. His descendants, the Alabasters, a corruption of Le Balister, held the manor for five generations. It then was passed to the Sacheville, or Sackville, and Copleston families through female heirs.

16th to 18th centuries 

The lord of Bicton held responsibility for managing the gaol, but it was removed from Bicton House to Exeter. It was purchased in the 16th century of the Coplestones by Sir Robert Denys (1525–1592) of nearby Holcombe Burnel, who built a new manor house and created one of the county's first enclosed deer parks. Sir Robert Denys's son, Sir Thomas Denys died and his daughter Anne Denys received the manor. She had married Sir Henry Rolle (d.1616) of Stevenstone, Devon and the estate was conveyed to her husband. Henry was the son of John Rolle, and great grandson to the founder of the Rolle family of Stevenstone, George Rolle (died 1552). Henry and the former Miss Deny's son, Dennis Rolle, Esquire died in 1638, leaving a son who died in his infancy and a daughter named Florence.

Henry's nephew, also named Henry, of Beam near Torrington, inherited the estate, but died without a living heir in 1647. The manor was then passed to John Rolle through marriage to his cousin Florence Rolle, co-heiress of Dennis Rolle, Esquire of Bicton, who at the time of his death in 1706 held nearly 40 manors in Devonshire and estates in Cornwall, Somersetshire, and Northamptonshire.  John had married the heiress of Marrais and settled there. He was made Knight of the Bath (K.B.) and was a representative for the county. John and Florence had four sons, the eldest son was the grandfather of Henry was made Baron Role in 1748 and died in 1750 without issue and the title became extinct. In 1787 the lord of the manor was exonerated from the superintendence of the county gaol. The title Baron Rolle was revived in 1796, when Henry Rolle's nephew, John Rolle, Esquire was created a peer by the same style and title.

19th and 20th centuries

In about 1800 John Rolle, 1st Baron Rolle (d.1842), son of Dennis Rolle (d.1797), replaced the old manor house with the existing three-storey mansion, designed by architect James Wyatt and built in red brick and limestone. Wyatt also designed the Lodge, built at the same time.

The site was described about 1820 to have a "commanding full view of the British Channel" and ancient beech and oak trees within the estate's park. The mansion, with two extensive wings, held an extensive collection of art, including works by Rembrandt and Ruysdael. It looked over the village of Otterton, with its little church, and the "lovely peep" between the Saltern and the ocean. A Gothic lodge is located at the main entrance, followed by a rustic inner lodge. Another entrance is by a "neat cottage-lodge." An obelisk is seen from most parts of the ground.

John Rolle, 1st Baron Rolle married the Hon. Louisa Trefusis, a relative and second daughter of Robert Trefusis, 17th Baron Clinton. He died without issue in 1842. On his inheritance in 1852 he changed his surname to Rolle; he died without issue in 1907, his heir being his nephew Charles John Robert Hepburn-Stuart-Forbes-Trefusis, 21st Baron Clinton (1863–1957).

Agricultural college 
In 1947 the 21st Baron Clinton leased (and later in 1957 sold) the house and part of the grounds to Devon County Council for the creation of Bicton Farm Institute, which later became Bicton College. In 1957 the same property was sold to the council. The present Baron Clinton continues to own part of the grounds and Bicton Arena, used for equestrian events, and the headquarters of the Clinton Devon Estates Company, which owns  of agricultural land in Devon ( of the county), is nearby.

During the Second World War it housed St Ronan's School, which is now based near Hawkhurst in Kent.

Notes

References

Grade II* listed buildings in Devon
Grade I listed parks and gardens in Devon
History of Devon
Country houses in Devon
Rolle family
Grade II* listed houses